Mitchell Lovelock-Fay (born 12 January 1992 in Canberra) is an Australian cyclist riding for the Avanti Racing Team.

Palmares
2012
1st Tour of Thailand
1st stage 2
2014
1st stage 3 Tour of Toowoomba (TTT)
1st Tour of Southland
1st Prologue (TTT) and stage 4
3rd Tour de Perth

References

1992 births
Living people
Australian male cyclists